An uma is the traditional house (rumah adat) of the Gajo district which borders Aceh on the Indonesian island of Sumatra. 

Like the majority of the traditional vernacular architecture of Austronesian peoples, an uma is a built on piles. It is inhabited by a number of related families and has a men's front gallery, central sleeping quarters and a rear women's gallery.

See also

 Architecture of Indonesia

References
 

Rumah adat